The Bonfire of the Vanities is a 1990 American satirical black comedy film directed and produced by Brian De Palma and starring Tom Hanks, Bruce Willis, Melanie Griffith, Kim Cattrall and Morgan Freeman. The screenplay, written by Michael Cristofer, was adapted from the bestselling 1987 novel of the same name by Tom Wolfe.

The film was a box office bomb, grossing just $15 million against its $47 million budget. The controversies surrounding the film were detailed in the 1991 book The Devil's Candy: The Bonfire of the Vanities Goes to Hollywood, by Julie Salamon.

Plot
Sherman McCoy is a Wall Street bond trader who makes millions while enjoying the good life and the sexual favors of Maria Ruskin, a Southern belle gold digger. Sherman and Maria are driving back to Maria's apartment from JFK Airport when they take a wrong turn on the expressway and find themselves in the "war-zone" of the South Bronx. 

They are approached by two black youths after Sherman gets out of the car to move a tire out of the road. He jumps back into the car and Maria guns the engine in reverse, running over one of the teenagers and they drive away. Sherman initially wants to report the incident to the police, but Maria immediately talks him out of it, fearing that their affair would be publicly exposed.

Meanwhile, alcoholic journalist Peter Fallow, anxious for a story to make good with his editor, comes upon the hit-and-run case as a rallying point for the black community calling upon Jewish district attorney Abe Weiss, who is the Bronx District Attorney seeking re-election. According to Judge Leonard White, almost all of DA Weiss' prosecutions end up with black and Puerto Rican defendants going to prison and Weiss is seeking a white defendant for purposes of convincing the minority-majority community that he is worth re-electing. 

Weiss recognizes the press coverage inherent in prosecuting the callow Sherman, who has been discovered as the owner of the car, and therefore presumed to be the hit-and-run driver, in order to cultivate the image as an avenger for the minorities and be propelled to the mayorship of New York City. As Sherman is brought to his knees, New York City fragments into different factions who use the case to suit their own cynical purposes.

Finally, Sherman is left without any allies to support him except for the sympathetic Judge Leonard White and the remorseful Fallow. Fallow gains a tremendous advantage and insight into the case when he is dating a woman who is the sub-letting landlord of Maria's apartment, and knows of secret recordings of conversations in the apartment made by the building owners to prove that the woman is not in fact living in the rent-controlled apartment herself. She discovers information about the McCoy case (where Maria states she was driving the car), which she gives to Fallow, who in turn covertly supplies it to McCoy's defense attorney. 

Sherman gets his hands on a tape and plays the recording in court, where it reveals Maria directly contradicting the evidence she has just given, showing she has been perjuring herself and causing her to faint. Sherman plays the tape on a tape recorder inside his briefcase connected to a small loudspeaker that he holds on the desk.

When the judge orders that he approach the bench with this evidence, he asserts that the tape is his (making it admissible evidence), resulting in his acquittal. The people in the court go into an uproar, to which Judge White launches into a tirade that they have no right to act self-righteous and smarmy, or that they are above Sherman, considering Reverend Bacon claims to help disadvantaged New Yorkers but actually engages in race baiting, or that the District Attorney Weiss pushed this case not in the interest of justice but in the interest of appealing to minority voters to further his political career by appealing to their desire to "get even". After the Judge made his point, he begs the people to be decent and change their ways, letting Sherman go.

A year later, a large audience is applauding the premiere of Fallow's book. Fallow says that Sherman McCoy has moved away from New York City to an unknown destination, presumably to live in obscurity.

Cast

In addition, George Plimpton has a credited cameo appearance, Geraldo Rivera has an uncredited cameo appearance, and Hanks's wife Rita Wilson has a small but intense role as the PR woman at the beginning of the movie.

Production

The novel of The Bonfire of the Vanities was a bestseller. Warner Bros. bought the rights from author Tom Wolfe for $750,000.

The film's production was plagued by controversy. Among them were the acting choices. When the project was first pitched and Mike Nichols was attached as the original director, he wanted Steve Martin for the role of Sherman McCoy, but the studio rejected it because they thought Martin was too old for the role. Tom Wolfe wanted Chevy Chase for McCoy. Kevin Costner, Tom Cruise and Christopher Reeve were also considered for the role.

Brian DePalma ultimately came on board to direct and offered the role of Peter Fallow to both Jack Nicholson and John Cleese (Fallow was English in the novel), but both actors turned down the role. When De Palma was unable to deliver an actor, the studio forced him to cast Bruce Willis, who had starred in the successful 1988 film Die Hard.

Walter Matthau was initially offered the role of the judge, but demanded a fee of $1 million. The producers balked at meeting his price and signed Alan Arkin instead for a modest $150,000. Arkin was then replaced by Morgan Freeman when the studio decided to change the judge's ethnicity from Jewish to African American in order to respond to criticism of the film's racial politics, and dialogue was added to have the judge denounce the manipulative actions of the main characters. De Palma said he "didn't want to racially polarize" the film by having "a white judge talking morality to a basically black audience." Arkin refused to waive his payment after being recast. Edward James Olmos was also considered for the role of the judge.

F. Murray Abraham, who had a significant part in the film, chose not to be credited because of a contract dispute. When he was denied the billing above the title that he had requested, he took his name off the picture.

De Palma wanted Uma Thurman to play Maria Ruskin. Thurman tested for the role, but Tom Hanks felt that she wasn't right for the part and, eventually, Melanie Griffith was cast instead.

The studio made significant changes to the source material, making Sherman McCoy more sympathetic and adding a subplot involving a minor character, Judge Leonard White (eventually played by Freeman).

Filming 
In one notable scene in the film, Maria Ruskin (Melanie Griffith) arrives in New York on an Air France Concorde. The film's Second Unit Director, Eric Schwab, calculated the time and day when a runway at JFK would line up exactly with the setting sun, to serve as a backdrop, and managed to film in the single 30-second time period when this occurs in any given year, while winning a bet that he could make the scene an essential part of the movie. The 5-camera shot cost $80,000 and lasted just 10 seconds in the final cut. Cinematographer Vilmos Zsigmond claimed credit for the shot in an American Cinematographer article.

Schwab also directed the opening title shot—an almost equally elaborate and expensive set-up requiring a 24-hour timelapse of Manhattan, from a camera platform beside a gargoyle on top of the Chrysler Building.

Several of the sets parodied the home decorated by Robert Denning and Vincent Fourcade for Carolyne Roehm and Henry Kravis.

The cover of Peter Fallow's book in the film has a similar design to the original first edition of Tom Wolfe's novel from 1987.

Cristofer's original script ended cynically with the supposed victim of the hit-and-run walking out of the hospital, suggesting that the whole scenario was concocted. That ending did not test well with audiences and was dropped.

Locations 
Sherman and Judy McCoy's luxury apartment was built on the Warner Bros. stage in Burbank, designed by Richard Sylbert. The Park Avenue exteriors were shot on location late at night, using rain effects and a prop phone booth. The lobby scenes were shot at 77 Park Avenue.

The courthouse interior scenes were shot at Queens County Courthouse, at night. Courthouse exteriors were at the Mario Merola Building / Bronx County Courthouse. The subway entrance was fake — there is no subway station there. Another courthouse scene showing a riot in slow-motion had been shot at the Essex County Courthouse in Newark but was omitted from the film following  negative reactions from test screenings.

The 330-second Steadicam shot of Peter Fallow arriving at the Palm Court of the Winter Garden was a tour de force for operator Larry McConkey.

The huge party scenes were shot at the L.A. Natural History Museum.

Reception
The film itself was a critical and commercial flop when it was released. It cost an estimated US$47 million to make, but initially grossed just over US$15 million at the US box office, making it a huge box office bomb.

Critical reception was largely negative. The film scores a 15% rating on Rotten Tomatoes, based on 52 reviews. The critical consensus reads: "The Bonfire of the Vanities is a vapid adaptation of a thoughtful book, fatally miscast and shorn of the source material's crucial sense of irony. Add it to the pyre of Hollywood's ambitious failures." In Leonard Maltin's annual Movie Guide publication, the film was given a "BOMB" rating, and described as an "appallingly heavy-handed 'comedy'".

Audiences polled by CinemaScore gave the film an average grade of "C" on an A+ to F scale.

In its review, Variety magazine stated, "the caricatures are so crude and the 'revelations' so unenlightening of the human condition that the satire is about as socially incisive as an entry in the Police Academy series." Vincent Canby of The New York Times denounced "Brian De Palma's gross, unfunny movie adaptation." Owen Gleiberman of Entertainment Weekly called it, "one of the most indecently bad movies of the year." Rita Kempley of The Washington Post stated "the director has become one with the buffoons Wolfe scored in his bestseller. He has not only filed Wolfe's teeth but stuck his tail between his legs," and called the film "a calamity of miscasting and commercial concessions".  In Rolling Stone, Peter Travers wrote, "On film, Bonfire achieves a consistency of ineptitude rare even in this era of over-inflated cinematic air bags." Gene Siskel, in The Chicago Tribune, wrote "preview audiences have hooted the film's revisionist ending, which concludes with a sermon. I didn't hoot because I was too sad. I gave up on the movie well before the ending."  In her review for the Los Angeles Times, Sheila Benson called the film, "an overstated, cartooned film for dullards". Steven Rea of The Philadelphia Inquirer, wrote "Big books have been bastardized by Hollywood before it's a time-honored tradition that counts Hemingway, Faulkner and the scribes of the Old Testament among its victims but you'd be hard-pressed to find an adaptation that screws up as royally as Brian De Palma's take on The Bonfire of the Vanities. Miscast, misguided and miserably unfunny, Tom Wolfe's black satire about avarice, prejudice and criminal injustice in the loony-toon town of New York has been raped and stripped of all ambiguity and dimension", and he ended the review by saying, "What a mess".

A less hostile review, 2.5 stars out of a possible 4, came from Roger Ebert of The Chicago Sun-Times. He felt that viewers who didn't read the novel might be confused by critical parts of the plot, and suggested Griffith and Freeman offered the best performances while Hanks was simply ineffective in his role. The film lacked the psychological depth of Wolfe's novel but "at least it does work well in a certain glossy way."

Commenting on the way Wolfe's story was adapted, Brian De Palma said, "The initial concept of it was incorrect. If you're going to do The Bonfire of the Vanities, you would have to make it a lot darker and more cynical, but because it was such an expensive movie, we tried to humanize the Sherman McCoy character a very unlikable character, much like the character in The Magnificent Ambersons. We could have done that if we'd been making a low-budget movie, but this was a studio movie with Tom Hanks in it. We made a couple of choices that, in retrospect, were wrong. I think John Lithgow would have been a better choice for Sherman McCoy, because he would have got the blue-blood arrogance of the character."

However, De Palma has been quick to downplay the notion that the movie suffered because of studio interference: "The initial producers, once we had cast Hanks, moved on and went over to Columbia Pictures, so I was sort of left to my own devices and pursued ways in which I thought I could make this movie more commercial and keep some edge of the book... I thought we were going to get away with it, but we didn't. I knew that the people who read the book were going to be extremely unhappy, and I said, 'Well, this is a movie; it isn't the book.' And I think if you look at the movie now, and you don't know anything about the book, and you get it out of the time that it was released, I think you can see it in a whole different way."

The Devil's Candy
The controversies surrounding the film were detailed in a 1991 book called The Devil's Candy: The Bonfire of the Vanities Goes to Hollywood by Julie Salamon, who was the film critic for The Wall Street Journal and wanted to document the novel's film adaptation. She was granted much access to the Bonfire filming by De Palma.

Among other things, the book describes how De Palma had a difficult relationship with then-rising star Bruce Willis who, in the words of Salamon, "was generally disliked by most of the cast and crew [due to his ego]". In one instance, during the filming of a scene in which Willis was with Alan King (the scene in which the character played by King dies), Willis challenged the crew to make the whole scene move along faster, allegedly because it was very hot on the set.

Although Willis was called out of the set by De Palma to discuss the event, this particular scene ended up being considerably shorter and simpler than originally intended. De Palma described The Devil's Candy as "a very good book. I let Julie Salamon see everything. She portrayed it all very accurately. But I mean, nobody realized it was going wrong when we were making it. We were very enthusiastic about what we were doing." Salamon's book was re-released in 2002 with the revised title The Devil's Candy: The Anatomy of a Hollywood Fiasco and additional material by Salamon (including Bruce Willis's negative reaction to the book).

The second season of the Turner Classic Movies podcast The Plot Thickens is named after the book and retells the story of the making of the film. It is largely based on Salamon's book and interviews, and prominently features Salamon as a narrator and participant.

Awards and nominations

References

Bibliography

External links

 
 
 
 
 

 

1990 comedy-drama films
1990 films
1990s black comedy films
1990s business films
1990s legal films
1990s satirical films
American black comedy films
American business films
American comedy-drama films
American legal films
American satirical films
1990s English-language films
Films about businesspeople
Films directed by Brian De Palma
Films based on American novels
Films based on works by Tom Wolfe
Films scored by Dave Grusin
Films set in New York City
Films shot in New York City
Films with screenplays by Michael Cristofer
Legal comedy films
Warner Bros. films
1990s American films